Oregon Ballot Measure 112, the Remove Slavery as Punishment for Crime from Constitution Amendment, is an amendment to the Constitution of Oregon passed as part of the 2022 Oregon elections. The measure removes the loophole where slavery and involuntary servitude are legal within the state as punishment for a crime. It added language that authorizes an Oregon court or probation or parole agency to order a person convicted of a crime to engage in education, counseling, treatment, community service, or other alternatives to incarceration, as part of sentencing for the crime.   

Four other states—Alabama, Louisiana, Tennessee and Vermont—considered similar amendments at the same time as Oregon (passed by all except Louisiana), and three states (Colorado, Nebraska and Utah) have previously voted to remove similar language.

See also 
 List of Oregon ballot measures

References 

2022 Oregon ballot measures
Slavery in the United States
Criminal justice reform in the United States
Criminal penalty ballot measures in the United States